Advanced Lawnmower Simulator is a 1988 simulation game for the ZX Spectrum. The player is tasked with mowing lawns in exchange for rewards.

The game was developed as an April Fools' joke by Your Sinclair, who published a joke review lauding it, and released the game on a cover tape. Several letters about the game appeared in the magazine following release, and it was revealed as an April Fools' prank in August 1990. The game has been noted as extremely unusual by IGN and Geek.com. It has also received a cult following, has received remakes, and has inspired other games with similar titles.

Gameplay 

The player is presented with a choice of six lawnmowers, five of which are inoperative and cannot be used. Once the only operative lawnmower has been picked, the player then uses it to mow a lawn. There is only one key ("M"), and pressing it mows one square of lawn. After a lawn is completely mowed, the player is rewarded if it was done well enough. All lawns are identical.

After a few lawns have been mowed, the player gets killed automatically (according to Your Sinclair, the mower "hits a rock and blows up") and the game starts over.

Development and release 
Advanced Lawnmower Simulator was first conceived as a prank in the April 1988 issue of Your Sinclair. The piece claimed the player takes on the role of a Youth Training Scheme junior gardener with a lawnmower, a small toolbox, and a can of petrol, and would be able to upgrade their equipment, including additional tools, more cans of petrol and more powerful "grassware". It also claimed that lawns get larger as the game progresses, have hidden traps such as stones, coat-hangers, and duck-ponds, and later levels would be rose gardens. The supposed developer and publisher Gardensoft were introduced as "a brand new publishing house that looks set to carve quite a niche for itself in the simulations market", and the piece claimed that they were going to release more games in the coming months, including a spring-cleaning game, a washing-up simulator (including a drying-up simulator), and a laundrette simulator in which players supposedly have to clean bags of various colours and materials. It was also stated that Advanced Lawnmower Simulator is "ACE!" and a "Guaranteed number one!", and would cost £14.95. It was also awarded a nine out of ten and given the magazine's MEGAGAME accolade. An advertisement, which described the game as "The most advanced domestic chore simulation yet to hit the home micro!" and claimed a release date of 1 April and that it would be available for purchase in garden centres, appeared in the same issue. The game was coded by Your Sinclair writer Duncan Macdonald, and released on a cover tape in the next issue. The game parodied Codemasters' habit of including the word "simulator" in its game titles. 

Your Sinclair revealed the review and game to be an April Fools' joke in August 1990 (after a series of letters about the game were supposedly posted to the magazine). The issue also claimed (with screenshots) there are three sequels to the game: one written by Rodney Sproston in which "alien grass has invaded the moon", Advanced Lawenmower Simulator III, in which the player inadvertently enters a nightmare whose only escape from is by mowing through a "dream hole", and ALS Part Four - The Revenge Of Mow, in which the player has to collect money after it falls out of their pocket after purchasing a new mower. The piece finished with the words "Utter crap."

Reception 

In 2008, Retro Gamer jokingly stated that Advanced Lawnmower Simulator "has been hailed as THE best game on the Spectrum", and made jocular judgements on the gameplay and graphics as "Outstanding" and "Excellent" respectively, and of the game as "a truly special experience".

Advanced Lawnmower Simulator appears on an IGN list of "Video Games You Won’t Believe Somebody Made", and a Geek.com list of "Weirdest Simulation Games of All Time". Vice described the prank as "one of the strangest incidents in mainstream publishing."

Legacy 

Advanced Lawnmower Simulator has received a cult following, and many remakes have been made. The game also inspired some homebrewed  games whose titles include the word "simulator". It has been ported to the Amstrad CPC and Amiga.

References

External links 
 

ZX Spectrum games
Simulation video games
April Fools' Day jokes
1988 video games
Video games developed in the United Kingdom
Parody video games
Amstrad CPC games
Amiga games
Single-player video games